Didazoonidae is a family of Vetulicolian chordates containing the species Didazoon haoae and Pomatrum ventralis.  Their fossils are from the Maotianshan shales Cambrian Lagerstätte.

References 

Vetulicolia
Prehistoric chordate families
Cambrian first appearances
Cambrian extinctions

Animal families